Hygrophoropsis flabelliformis is a species of fungus in the family Hygrophoropsidaceae. It was first described by mycologists Miles Joseph Berkeley and Henry William Ravenel in 1853 as Cantharellus flabelliformis. E.J.H. Corner transferred it to the genus Hygrophoropsis in 1966.

References

External links

Hygrophoropsidaceae
Fungi described in 1853
Taxa named by Miles Joseph Berkeley